Glen Eden railway station is located on the Western Line of the AT Metro rail network in Auckland, New Zealand. The station house is a local historical landmark that was restored in 2001. A cafe is located in the old station building.

History 

The station was opened on 29 March 1880 as one of the original stations on the North Auckland Line. The station's location determined the placement of the nearby Waikumete Cemetery. Special trains ran from Auckland on Sundays carrying the deceased and their entourage, and a dedicated platform was constructed to serve these trains. This unique function is one of the reasons that the station is registered by Heritage New Zealand as a Category II heritage building. The station was added to the heritage register on 30 October 1998, with register number 7435.

The train station was the centre of the Glen Eden community during the turn of the century, with most stores and services located adjacent to the station. The station habitually dealt with scrub fires, caused due to sparks from the locomotive engines and the adjacent Archibald's Sawmill. The Waikumete Cemetery was opened in 1886, due to its proximity to the train station. The station became a transportation hub for Waitākere Ranges holidaymakers, who would take coaches from the train station to holiday at guest houses located in places such as Waiatarua, Karekare and Piha.

Services
Bus routes 152, 154, 172 and 172X pass by the station on the adjacent West Coast Road.

See also 
 List of Auckland railway stations
 Public transport in Auckland

References 

Rail transport in Auckland
Railway stations in New Zealand
Railway stations opened in 1880
Waitākere Ranges Local Board Area
Heritage New Zealand Category 2 historic places in the Auckland Region
Buildings and structures in Auckland
West Auckland, New Zealand